This is a list of the tallest buildings in Islamabad, the capital city of Pakistan.

Operational buildings

The list includes the tallest buildings (completed and topped out) in Islamabad as well as some buildings in Rawalpindi.

Under construction buildings
This lists buildings that are under construction and are planned to rise at least .  Buildings that are only approved, on-hold or proposed are not included in this table.

See also
 List of tallest buildings in Pakistan
 List of tallest buildings and structures in South Asia

References 

Buildings and structures in Islamabad
Islamabad